Neusorg is a municipality in the district of Tirschenreuth in Bavaria, Germany. The town itself is the seat of Neusorg municipal federation.

Geography
Neusorg has nine Ortsteile: Neusorg, Riglasreuth, Schwarzenreuth, Stockau, Stöcken, Wäsch, Weihermühle, and Wernersreuth.

References

External links

 

Tirschenreuth (district)